Nimoy is a surname, and may refer to:

Leonard Nimoy (1931–2015), actor, director, and musician best known for playing Spock in Star Trek
Jeff Nimoy, Emmy Award-winning voice actor and writer, (second cousin, once removed, of Leonard Nimoy)
Adam Nimoy, television director (son of Leonard Nimoy)
Sandi Nimoy (1927–2011), American actor
Susan Nimoy, American actor

See also